Zhejiang or Chekiang is a de jure province in the Republic of China according to the ROC law, as the ROC government formally claims to be the legitimate government of the whole China. Founded after the collapse of the Qing dynasty, it was de facto abolished after the ROC Forces, ROC government officials and local residents were evacuated from Dachen to Taiwan in 1955 following the military defeat of the ROC by People's Liberation Army forces of the newly-founded People's Republic of China during the Battle of Dachen Archipelago.

After the Chinese Civil War, the Kuomintang-led Republic of China government lost its control in Mainland China and only held several islands east of mainland Chekiang Province, including Dachen, Yijiangshan, Pishan, Toumenshan, Yushan Island and Nanji. After losing the mainland, the Nationalists used the islands to stage commando raids into Zhejiang, occasionally penetrating as far as the area around Shanghai. The county governments withdrawn to the islands from the mainland included seven counties, namely Wenling, Linhai, Huangyan, Pinyang, Sanmen, Leqing and Yuhuan. Chiang Kai-shek, the late President of the Republic of China, appointed Hu Zongnan, the general of the ROC Armed Forces, to establish the "Government of Chekiang Province" on the Dachen Islands in September 1951. Its purpose was to fight against the mainland which was controlled by the Chinese Communist Party.

In 1952, the Chekiang Government reorganized the seven counties into four counties, which were Wenling, Linhai, Pinyang and Yuhuan. Sanmen county was reorganised as "Yushan Administrative Bureau", and "Zhuyu Administrative Bureau" was also established. These administrative bureaus were originally intended to be used as the "special region" for direct economic trading with Mainland China, however they were abolished one year later. In 1953, the Chekiang Government office moved to Taiwan. In 1955, the People's Liberation Army conquered Yijiangshan Island during the Battle of Yijiangshan Islands. 

The Republic of China evacuated the military garrison and civil residents from Dachen and Nanji to the island of Taiwan with the assistance of the United States Seventh Fleet. The Chekiang Government on Taiwan was abolished soon afterwards, and the People's Republic of China successfully occupied the offshore islands, establishing control over the whole of Zhejiang Province. However, the ROC does not recognize changes in administrative divisions made by the PRC, including this province, official maps of the ROC government shows Chekiang Province in its pre-1949 boundaries.

List of governors

Military governors

Civil governors

Chairperson of the Provincial Government

See also
Zhejiang Province
Dachen Islands
Yijiangshan Islands
Battle of Dachen Archipelago
Battle of Yijiangshan Islands
Fujian Province, Republic of China and Taiwan Province

Notes

References

Bibliography

External links
 

Provinces of the Republic of China (1912–1949)
History of Zhejiang
1912 establishments in China
1955 disestablishments in Taiwan
1955 disestablishments in China
Territorial disputes of the Republic of China